This is a list of members of the South Australian Legislative Council from 1956 to 1959.

References
Parliament of South Australia — Statistical Record of the Legislature

Members of South Australian parliaments by term
20th-century Australian politicians